Ivy Heitland (1875–1895) was an English painter who died young.

She was raised by a family of artists, with her promising career cut short due to her death at the age 19. Heitland was born and trained in England and her work Through the Wood was included in the book Women Painters of the World.

References

1875 births
1895 deaths
English women painters
19th-century British women artists
19th-century English women
19th-century English people